Pine Island Public Schools is a public school district in Pine Island, Minnesota, located in the heart of the town. This school first started out in an old cabin in 1857 but was moved to its current location in 1864. All three schools, elementary, middle and high school, are located in one building with extra portable classrooms.

History
This land that the school stands on was donated by Moses Jewell and the brick building was put up costing $3000.  There was an addition later that was known as the high school.  The population from there had grown and the first graduation that took place was in 1887.  "In the early 1990s – the flipping of pennies on school premises was strictly forbidden, and the use of the Lord’s Prayer in schools violated the Minnesota State Constitution." For sports there was football, baseball, boys and girls basketball, the team was known as the "young tigers" that wore green and white uniforms. This was changed in 1925 and remain to this day; they are now the panthers and wear maroon and gold.

In 1903 the state informed them that they needed to build a new high school, so that is what they did. There stands in the same spot a three-story brick building. In the new gym the ceilings were too low to play basketball in, so games were played at the local Opera House than later on the 2nd floor of City Hall. In 1922 there was a problem because there was ninety-three students enrolled in the high school but there was a seating capacity of seventy-two. A year later physical education was required by state law. The kindergarten class was declared illegal because there was no normal department.

In 1932 there was the first junior-senior proms help in City Hall, which was decorated with a lot of paper and sweet peas. The school had then become overcrowded again, so they went to rebuild. Just as they were about to start it was struck by lightning was burned to the ground. There was a new building donated as a way to thank the tax payers. 1935 the band started up with just 8 instruments being used by 25 members. The hot lunch was introduced in 1938 being served a cocoa and hot thing. In 1940 the athletic fields were purchased for $1000 and new buses would take athletes around to games. Students in the '50s referred to the third floor as "7th heaven".  The school went under many constructions to fit the climbing number of students finally in 1971 the school was basically finished.

High school
Classes Offered:

Agriculture
Art
Business – Accounting, Business Technology and the web, Advanced Computer Applications word, excel and powerpoint, Introduction to Business, Marketing, Personal Computer Applications, English, Languages
Family and consumer science – Quilting, Living Skills, Advanced Foods, Special Foods, FACS I & II
Health – Seventh Grade – skeletal system, muscular system, digestive system, tabacoo and drug use. Eighth Grade – circulatory system, respiratory system, excretory system, nervous system, endocrine system, and reproductive system. High School – aging and death, alcohol and drugs, CPR, mental health, nutrition, unintended pregnancies and STD's.
Technology and Engineering – Four main content areas: communication, construction, manufacturing, and power. Works on developing towards career choices.
Mathematics – Algebra 2, Integrated Math, Trigonometry, Analytical Geometry Probability and Statistics, and Calculus.
Media – Introduction to Photography
Music – Band, Choir, and Orchestra
Physical Education
Science – Biology, Chemistry, Applied Science, Advanced Biology, Chemistry, Physical Science, and Physics.
Social Studies – United States History, World Cultures, European Studies, Government, Economics, Attitudes, and Law.
Work Place Readiness
Languages – Introduction to Spanish

Elementary and Middle School
Homework Help:
The PASS program is available if students are ill or having any troubles in class or with your homework there is a place and time to receive help. This takes place on Tuesday and Thursday afternoons.

Athletics
Hiawatha Valley League
Minnesota State High School League
Baseball
Basketball
Cross Country
Football
Golf
Gymnastics
Soccer
Softball
Track
Volleyball
Wrestling

Extracurricular Activities
All School Play
Art Scream
Culture Club
Deca
Environmental Club
FCCLA
FFA
HVL Honor Music
Knowledge Bowl
Math League
Mock Trail
Music Listening
National Honor Society
One Act Play
Panther Crew
Peer Helpers
Pep Band
SADD
Speech Team
Student Council
Robotics

References

External links
Handbooks – ISD 255 – Pine Island

1857 establishments in Minnesota Territory
Education in Goodhue County, Minnesota
School districts established in 1857
School districts in Minnesota